This paleobotany list records new fossil plant taxa that were to be described during the year 1952, as well as notes other significant paleobotany discoveries and events which occurred during 1952.

Mosses

Ferns

Cycadophytes

Conifers

Cupressaceae

Flowering plants

Nymphales

Magnoliids

Monocots

Basal eudicots

Core Eudicots

Superasterids

Superrosids

Other angiosperms

General research
 Robert LaMotte publishes the Catalogue of the Cenozoic plants of North America through 1950, with numerous nomenclatural updates and corrections.

References 

1952 in paleontology
Paleobotany